Kitty Kántor (born 15 October 1993) is a Hungarian actress. She contributes to voicing characters in cartoons, anime, movies, sitcoms, and more content. Kántor is known for voicing Isabella Garcia-Shapiro in the Hungarian-language version of the Disney Channel original animated series Phineas and Ferb.  She also voiced Hinata Hyuga in the Jetix edition of the anime series Naruto.

Kántor is also known for dubbing over many actresses such as Evanna Lynch, Allisyn Ashley Arm, Dakota Fanning, Abigail Breslin, and other famous actresses.

Currently, she works at SDI Media Hungary, Mafilm Audio, and other dubbing studios located in Budapest.

Filmography 
 Emma in The Collector
 Nóra Balogh (young) in Barátok közt
 Tímea in Szörnyek ebédje

Voice dubbing roles

Animation 
 Isabella Garcia-Shapiro in Phineas and Ferb
 Isabella Garcia-Shapiro/Isabella-2 in Phineas and Ferb the Movie: Across the 2nd Dimension
 Kirari Tsukishima in Kilari
 Numbuh 3 in Codename: Kids Next Door
 Rin in InuYasha
 Hinata Hyuga in Naruto (Jetix edition)
 Jaarin Lee in Digimon Tamers
 Young Yuki in Vampire Knight
 Yoko Okino in Case Closed
 Pearl in Finding Nemo
 Chicken 2 in The Ugly Duckling and Me!
 Marlene in Pinocchio 3000
 Fabia Sheen in Bakugan: Gundalian Invaders
 Apple Bloom in My Little Pony: Friendship is Magic
 Katie in Paw Patrol
 Penny Sanchez in ChalkZone

Live action 
 Angela Ashford in Resident Evil: Apocalypse
 Sarah Davis in Raising Helen
 Zora Lancaster in Sonny with a Chance
 Max in The Suite Life of Zack & Cody
 Bridgette Dubois in Medium
 Luna Lovegood in Harry Potter
 Violet Beauregarde in Charlie and the Chocolate Factory
 Keegan in Holiday in the Sun
 Olivia Kendall in The Cosby Show
 Heidi Phillips in Grace Is Gone
 Samara Morgan in The Ring

References

External links 
 
  Kitty Kántor at Port.hu

1993 births
Living people
Hungarian television actresses
Hungarian voice actresses